Sewallcrest Park is a public park in Portland, Oregon's Richmond neighborhood, in the United States. The  park was acquired in 1940.

See also
 List of parks in Portland, Oregon

References

External links
 

1940 establishments in Oregon
Parks in Portland, Oregon
Protected areas established in 1940
Richmond, Portland, Oregon